Changping railway station may refer to:
 Changping railway station (Guangdong) (常平), in Changping, Dongguan, China
 Changping railway station (Beijing) (昌平), in Changping District, Beijing
 Changping station (Beijing Subway), on the Changping Line, Beijing